Jazz at the Hi-Hat is a live album by saxophonist Sonny Stitt recorded in Boston in 1954 and originally released on the Roost label as a four track 10 inch LP. The original album has been expanded with additional material and released on CD in two volumes.

Reception
The Allmusic review by Scott Yanow states, "this CD gives one a good all-around sampling of early Sonny Stitt".

Track listing 
All compositions by Sonny Stitt except as indicated

Volume 1:
 "Blue and Sentimental" (Count Basie, Mack David, Jerry Livingston) - 3:08  
 "Thou Swell" (Lorenz Hart, Richard Rodgers) 
 "Every Tub" (Basie, Eddie Durham) 
 "Pennies from Heaven" (Johnny Burke, Arthur Johnston) 
 "Sweet Georgia Brown" (Ben Bernie, Kenneth Casey, Maceo Pinkard) - 5:00 additional track on CD release  
 "I'm in the Mood for Love" (Dorothy Fields, Jimmy McHugh) - 4:43 additional track on CD release  
 "Tri-Horn Blues"  additional track on CD release
 "If I Should Lose You" (Ralph Rainger, Leo Robin) - 4:43 additional track on CD release 
 "(Back Home Again In) Indiana" (James F. Hanley, Ballard MacDonald) - 5:04 additional track on CD release  
 "Wigwam" - 2:53 additional track on CD release
 "My Melancholy Baby" (Ernie Burnett, George Norton) additional track on CD release 
 "Flying Home" (Benny Goodman, Lionel Hampton, Sydney Robin) - 3:14 additional track on CD release
Volume 2:
 "S.O.S. (Columbus Avenue Rhythm)" - 8:06    
 "Rockin' at the Hi-Hat" - 2:23    
 "(Back Home Again In) Indiana" (Hanley, MacDonald) - 3:14    
 "They Can't Take That Away from Me" (George Gershwin, Ira Gershwin) - 4:24    
 "Lover" (Hart, Rodgers) - 3:04    
 "Flying Home" (Goodman, Hampton, Robin) - 2:55    
 "Mass Ave. Swing" - 2:29    
 "They Say It's Wonderful" (Irving Berlin) - 2:10    
 "One O'Clock Jump" (Basie, Durham) - 12:22    
 "Jeepers Creepers" (Johnny Mercer, Harry Warren) - 4:16    
 "Baritone Blues" - 4:01    
 "How High the Moon" (Nancy Hamilton, Morgan Lewis) - 6:10    
 "Body and Soul" (Frank Eyton, Johnny Green, Edward Heyman, Robert Sour) - 3:53    
 "If I Had You" (Jimmy Campbell, Reg Connelly, Ted Shapiro) - 1:59    
 "Jumpin' with Symphony Sid" (Lester Young) - 2:42

Personnel 
Sonny Stitt - alto saxophone, tenor saxophone, baritone saxophone 
Dean Earl - piano
Bernie Griggs - bass
Marquis Foster - drums

References 

1955 live albums
Roost Records live albums
Sonny Stitt live albums
Albums produced by Teddy Reig